Institute for Scintillation Materials of NAS of Ukraine is a Ukrainian leading research centre specializing in luminescent and scintillation materials research and development and can be ranked in the top of the European and international research organizations working in the area of radiation detection.

Main scientific directions
 scintillation and luminescent environment materials science;
 fundamental researches of radiation and matter interaction;
 the technologies and nano-technologies development on scintillation detectors production and production of devices on their basis.

External links
 Official web site

Research institutes in Ukraine